Ben Kelly may refer to:

 Ben Kelly (designer), English graphic and interior designer
 Ben Kelly (gridiron football) (born 1978), American football player